Staunton Harold Reservoir is a large reservoir under the management of Severn Trent Water, located between Melbourne and Ticknall in Derbyshire, England. Most of the water is within Derbyshire but a small part of the southern shore is over the border in Leicestershire.

The reservoir was built in 1964 at the behest of the River Dove Water Board, meant to serve Leicester and the towns of northern Leicestershire. Although no villages were lost in the construction of the reservoir, Furnace Farm, New England Farm and Calke Mill were submerged; their remains lie 25 metres below the surface. The dam wall is a clay core construction, similar to the dam wall at Ladybower Reservoir. Part of the shoreline border the Calke Abbey estate, as well as the National Forest.

Staunton Harold hosts a natural habitat for much bird and plant life, and is also home to Dimmingsdale Nature Reserve. There is also a sailing club, a visitors' centre and a children's adventure playground available to visitors. A non-functioning windmill dominates the skyline close to the visitors' centre called Tower Windmill, built in 1797 by the first Lord Melbourne at a cost of £250. Since July 2022, Severn Trent has been working with the National Trust to manage this site.

References 

http://www.derbyshireuk.net/staunton_harold_reservoir.html
http://www.bbc.co.uk/insideout/eastmidlands/series4/east_midlands_reservoirs.shtml
https://www.nationaltrust.org.uk/staunton-harold

External links

Reservoirs in Derbyshire
Reservoirs in Leicestershire